E.V.A. (Eve Versus Adam) is an Italian pop band formed in Milan in 1996.

Biography
E.V.A began their career as a cover band in the early 1990s. The turning point was the arrival of the new singer Manuela Dimase, who joined the band in 1996. With her, E.V.A. performed in over 300 live concerts all around Italy. While on tour in 2000, they began to write their own songs. In spring 2002 the band took part in the San Marino Festival and was classed second. In the same year they began the promotion of their first single "L’importante è finire" produced with the collaboration of the arranger Mario Natale. The song became a hit on Italian radio station and was broadcast as a New Hit on RTL 102.5. The following single entered the Musica e Dischi singles chart, reaching the position 31. After several media events in 2004, E.V.A. spent the following year writing and recording their album produced by Andrea Piraz. Fiori di polvere was published on 5 May 2006.

Discography 
 Fiori di polvere (2006)

Members
 Manuela Dimase: vocals (1996-)
 Giulia Ferrario: bass (1996- )
 Paola Ferrario: guitar (1996- )
 Laura Ghellere: drums (1996- )
 Daniela Minerva: keyboards (1996- )

External links
Official band website

Italian pop music groups
Musical groups established in 1996
Musical groups from Milan